Nimbahera railway station is a railway station in Chittaurgarh district, Rajasthan. Its code is NBH. It serves Nimbahera town. The station consists of a single platform. Passenger, Express, and Superfast trains halt here.

Trains

The following trains halt at Nimbahera railway station in both directions:

 Bandra Terminus–Udaipur Express
 Bandra Terminus–Udaipur Superfast Express
 Bhopal–Jaipur Express
 Veer Bhumi Chittaurgarh Express
 Ratlam–Udaipur City Express
 Jodhpur–Indore Express

References

Railway stations in Chittorgarh district
Ratlam railway division